TikTok food trends are specific food recipes and food-related fads on the social media platform TikTok. This content amassed popularity in 2020 during the COVID-19 pandemic, as many people cooked and ate at home and more people turned to social media for entertainment. While some TikTok users share their diets and recipes, others expand their brand or image on TikTok through step-by-step videos of easy and popular recipes. Users often refer to food-related content as "FoodTok."

The hashtags #TikTokFood and #FoodTok are used to identify food-related content, and have been viewed 40.2 billion and 9.7 billion times respectively since the app's creation, according to the company. Food trends have had profound societal impacts on their millions of viewers. There has been increased popularity in youth cooking, conversations on body image, use of marketing of food products on social media, and food shortages due to mass trends. Certain TikTok content creators such as Eitan Bernath, Jeron Combs, and Emily Mariko have achieved fame by crafting recipes that have become food trends. They and their colleagues have developed recipes such as the leftover salmon bowl, baked feta cheese pasta, and pesto eggs.

Timeline

2020

Dalgona coffee 

Dalgona coffee is whipped coffee that is made by combining equal parts of coffee, sugar, hot water, and then whipping the mixture to produce a froth-like texture. Dalgona coffee originates from Macau, but first emerged as a trend in South Korea where it earned its name. In March 2020, the trend emerged in the United States.

Mini pancake cereal 
Mini pancake cereal is a TikTok food trend where pancakes are made in miniature and served in the style of breakfast cereal. To replicate a bowl of cereal, users make tiny pancakes and add them to a bowl usually topped with maple syrup and butter. Sydney Melhoff (@sydneymelhoff) is credited with first posting the trend on the platform in April. Following the pancake cereal trend, several individuals developed their own take on the dish and recreated it using different foods like cookies, donuts, and croissants.

Decorative focaccia bread 
This TikTok trend was created in home kitchens, using the hashtag #focacciaart in the spring season of 2020. People decorate focaccia loaves with vegetables, herbs, and more.

Cloud bread 
Cloud bread is a light and fluffy low-carb substitute for bread made with egg whites, corn starch, and sugar. Cloud bread became popular on TikTok in July and @linqanaaa is credited for bringing it to the platform.

Hot chocolate bombs 
Hot chocolate bombs (also known as cocoa bombs) became popular on TikTok by the inventor, Eric Torres-Garcia, in December 2020. They are chocolate spheres filled with hot chocolate powder and other confections, such as marshmallows, that are then submerged into hot milk which causes the chocolate sphere to erupt. They became popular around the Christmas of 2020, prompting several bakers and store owners to add these confections to their menus. Eric Torres Garcia claims to have posted the first cocoa bombs video on TikTok. Since then, many people have attempted to recreate the dessert as well as create their own signature chocolate bombs.

2021

Baked feta cheese pasta 
The simplicity and ease of creating the dish is something that has allowed the recipe to go viral. The dish is made using a few simple ingredients: cherry tomatoes, a block of feta cheese, olive oil, pasta, basil, and garlic.  In 2019, a Finnish food blogger name Jenni Häyrinen developed the dish but it only went on to became viral in February of 2021. The trend became so popular that it caused a shortage of feta cheese in Finnish grocery stores.

Nature's cereal 
Nature's cereal is a trend on TikTok developed by user @natures_food in March 2021, where traditional cereal is replaced with fruit; and the milk is replaced with coconut water. Some users claim this cereal relieves constipation and gives people energy. One factor that has boosted the popularity of this trend is the attention it received from singer Lizzo who posted several videos of herself enjoying nature's cereal.

Baked Oats 
This trend originating in the spring of 2021, starts with using oat flour, instead of whole oats. Baked oats can be a variety of different flavors and can be baked in a short amount of time.

Pesto eggs 
Pesto eggs is a TikTok food trend involving the substitution of pesto sauce for oil when cooking eggs on a stovetop. The technique is successful since pesto sauce already contains olive oil as a primary ingredient. Amy Wilichowsky, a dietitian and TikToker, shared a video of her cooking eggs using the technique on the social media platform on April 24, 2021, and is credited as the creator of the trend. The original recipe included bread topped with avocado, ricotta cheese, honey, salt, pepper, and red pepper flakes but multiple variations have arisen since then.

Pasta Chips 
Pasta chips was created in June 2021 and are mostly eaten as a snack or appetizer. After cooking pasta in boiling water, the pasta is then added to an air fryer to get crispy. Pasta chips can be seasoned in a variety of different flavors.

Frozen honey 
In the summer of 2021, eating honey frozen from a plastic bottle went viral on TikTok. The hashtag #FrozenHoney achieved nearly 600 million views by the start of August according to the company. The origin of the trend is unclear, although NBC News noted that ASMR creators had previously consumed frozen honey in their YouTube videos because their audiences found the noise satisfying to listen to. However, NBC News reported that some users on the app had experienced diarrhea or otherwise felt sick. The article speculated that the cause could be the amount consumed, saying that while honey does not pose a health risk in small amounts, eating an excessive amount can cause diarrhea or dental issues.

Leftover salmon bowl 
The salmon rice bowl trend was originally developed by TikTok lifestyle influencer Emily Mariko. The recipe was first introduced on August 25, 2021, but was revised multiple times with the final variation uploaded on September 21, 2021. The video received forty million views and inspired one hundred and fifty-five videos with related content. In this dish, mashed salmon and rice are heated in a microwave and then covered in mayonnaise, soy sauce, and sriracha. It is consumed with kimchi and dried nori seaweed squares. Mariko heats the dish with an ice cube on top to steam the rice while it is heating up. This salmon rice bowl is easy to make due to its simple and few ingredients, under 5 minute cooking time, and incorporation of leftover salmon.

Chili oil eggs 
This is TikToker, Jen Curley's, twist on pesto eggs created in September 2021. Only two ingredients, these eggs have complex umami flavors from the chili oil.

Flamin' Hot Cheetos salad 
TikTok user @rxthism created a viral recipe by adding Flamin' Hot Cheetos to a salad mix. With over four and a half million views, this mixture of cucumbers, Flamin' Hot Cheetos, hot sauce, cilantro, and lemon juice has sparked substantial interest. The implementation of junk food into a regular dish became a new trend in FoodTok in September 2021, and more creative dishes of the sort were created in response.

2022

Green Goddess Cabbage Salad 
Created by Baked by Melissa in January 2022, this vegan pesto-like dressing is accompanied by nuts and any vegetables you may have on hand. Typically, this salad is made with shredded cabbage, cucumbers, chives, and scallions.

Spicy Pickled Garlic 
Spicy Pickled Garlic is credited to TikTok user @lalaleluu in March 2022. This trend consists of pickled garlic in a jar, sriracha, chili flakes, and thyme.

Cowboy Caviar 
Originally created by TikTok user @brialem in June 2022, Cowboy Caviar was arguably the most viral recipe of the year with over 17 million views and 2.7 million likes. This dip typically contains beans, corn, avocado, tomatoes, peppers, onions, and a dressing, but can include as many (or as few) ingredients as desired. Fans of the dip have created variations by adding ingredients like mangoes, peaches, and pomegranate seeds.

Notable figures

Eitan Bernanth 
Eitan Bernath is a 19-year-old TikTok star with over 1.6 million followers on the platform as of May 2021. After teaching himself to cook by watching YouTube and the Food Network, he posted his first TikTok in 2019: within 24 hours of posting his first video on an easy-to-make recipe, he gained tens of thousands of followers. His trademark upbeat and energetic behavior in combination with his focus on easy recipes differentiates him from traditional culinary experts.

Jeron Combs 
Jeron Combs posted his first TikTok video in May 2020 from a prison cell, and since then has attracted millions of viewers. Combs converted his metal bed frame into a cooking surface and documented his meal preparation process. His account, @blockboyjmoney, has now been deleted from TikTok's platform, but an alternative account with the handle @blaise.x0 posts videos on his behalf to over 330,000 followers as reported by the company.

Emily Mariko 
Emily Mariko attained TikTok fame after posting a recipe video about leftover salmon bowls on August 25, 2021. Her signature salmon dish, along with the lack of music and filler audio in contrast to most TikTok culinary videos, has created a following of over 6 million people.

Jeremy Scheck 
With over 2 million followers on TikTok, Jeremy Scheck is a college student who creates culinary content that focuses on culture, nutrition, and humor. He quickly found success after taking classes relating to dairy science, nutrition, and horticulture. His nutritional commentary and cultural references stem from his university coursework.

Jessica Woo 
As a mother of three, Jessica Woo documents her process for packing her kids’ lunches. Her focus on consistently artful presentations of common foods, such as salami and string cheese, draws an audience of over 5 million viewers as of August 2020. Her handwritten notes and catchphrase, “let’s make some lunch for my kids,” attract hundreds of thousands of viewers to her videos, and she cites an emphasis on being “like a regular mom” as her key to success.

@menwiththepot 
This TikToker is known for using unique kitchen tools, in very scenic landscapes. His scenery mostly consists of a wilderness backdrop. This user uses massive knives to cut his food for his recipes and then cooks it in his huge pot.

Societal impact

Body image 
TikTok food trends are sometimes seen or used as templates for a healthier, nutritional lifestyle for viewers to follow. However, many of these posts are created by users who lack professional qualifications to promote these ideas. Quite often, these food trends are associated with lifestyle tips, therefore influencing their diet, daily tasks, and personal routine. On the other hand, TikTok food trends can encourage and stimulate body positivity and allow people to promote the importance of self-satisfaction relating to body image if they so desire. These food trends can be an opportunity to express themselves and their personal diet choices, while also not conforming to the ideas created by novice users.

'What I Eat in a Day' videos have been criticised for causing more harm than good. These videos are meant to give an inside look into influencers eating habits; however, Cara Harbstreet says that the cost, time, and energy it takes to produce this day's worth of food, is often left off-camera. Harbstreet, MS, RD, LD, of Street Smart Nutrition, states that the main issue is that influencers are saying, If you eat like me, you can look like me." This contributes to an unhealthy obsession with healthy eating and disordered eating behaviors.

Food shortages 
TikTok food trends have also caused food shortages of ingredients highlighted in viral videos. For example, the baked feta cheese pasta trend resulted in feta cheese shortages.  Saxelby Cheesemongers, a cheese seller based in Rhode Island, was affected by this shortage. Its warehouse in Brooklyn usually sells about two-thousand pounds of cheese per week to their regular customers in the city. However, after the video of feta cheese pasta was released, its distributor stated there was none in stock. Other cheese companies, such as Winnimere, reported similar impacts.

Dangerous TikTok food trends 
According to food safety experts, there are some viral TikTok trends that should be avoided. According to Janilyn Hutchings, instructions given on TikTok for making grilled cheese sandwiches in a toaster risked causing kitchen fires, because toasters are not designed like panini presses.

Increased popularity of youth cooking 
The easy-to-follow nature of TikTok food trends, recipes, and tutorial videos has led to an increase in youth interaction with the platform. TikTok has proved itself to be an accessible platform for teaching youth groups about basic cooking skills and nutrition. The short duration of TikTok videos on the has requires more compressed and clear recipes, taking away from the complexity usually associated with cooking. With 92% of U.S. adolescents having access to the Internet on a daily basis, TikTok has become an extremely accessible source of information for them to gain practical information, including cooking skills.

A popular trend for college students was folding a tortilla wrap into four triangular pieces and filling it with at-home ingredients such as vegetables and cold meats. Jeremy Scheck, an undergraduate at Cornell University, began to create TikTok content about his passion for food and his recipes when the COVID-19 pandemic began in early 2020. When school transitioned online, Scheck shared trending recipes such as crispy potatoes and fried rice that sparked interest for college students like himself.

Popularity of TikTok recipes among college students may stem from their interest in staying away from fast food. These trends also help college students feel more comfortable in the kitchen.

Marketing 
TikTok has turned into a marketing platform for many brands as cooking-related products gained popularity in the past year. Surveys have proven that using TikTok as a marketing tool has been a successful investment for restaurants or individual food items. The instant feedback allows each company to discover what factors affect the popularity of their products through both reactions to and numbers of views of posts. For instance, Nutter Butter's TikTok has repeatedly dueted TikTok stars including Bella Poarch to reach a larger audience. Another example is when Dunkin’ Donuts launched a collaboration with TikTok star Charli D’Amelio to promote a new beverage and the corporation as a whole. From this, Dunkin’ cold brew sales rose 20% and 45% respectively in the first two days after the launch. On top of that, the first collaboration video concluded with a 57% increase in the Dunkin’ mobile app downloads (corresponding to downloads within 90 days preceding).

It also benefits corporations by providing recommendations to improve their marketing strategy, food items, décor, or any other factor illustrated in the ad. Some input that drives future marketing decisions on platforms like TikTok would include the attractiveness of the items advertised, innovation regarding new and interesting products, and the level of ease for the consumer to purchase the product after seeing the post. Drivers such as these can eliminate possible negative connotations surrounding a product and influence positive reinforcement, feedback, and action for and by the consumer. An example of a company that implements these strategies is Chipotle Mexican Grill. One of their social campaigns is creating TikTok challenges like #GuacDance and #Boorito, in which they create interactive content that follows current social media trends to stimulate an increase in revenue. In particular, #GuacDance became the largest “branded” challenge in the United States with hundreds of thousands of user responses within the week-long event. This campaign resulted in the more than 800,000 sides of guacamole given out on July 31, 2019.

References 

2020s fads and trends
2020s in food
Food and drink culture
TikTok